Labrang Monastery (Sikkim), Palden Phuntshog Phodrang or Palden Phuntsok Monastery  is a Buddhist monastery located in North Sikkim district in Sikkim, northeastern India.

Geographic location 
Labrang Monastery is situated 38 km from Gangtok and located on the flat ground on the hill top having altitude of 7000 ft. It is surrounded by lush green jungle. It is located 2 km from Phodong Monastery.

History 
Labrang gompa was constructed in Tumlong, North Sikkim in 1826 CE and completed in 1843 CE. The founder of the monastery was Gyaltsey Rigzin Champo who was the son of King Tshugphud Nmgyal and he was the first Kapgain of the monastery. The Palden Phuntshok monastery was built by Gyalshe Rigzing Chempa in the memory of Latsun Chembo of Kongpu, Tibet. Major renovation was carried out in 1978 with government aid.

Architecture 
This monastery has retained its unique architecture as most other older wooden structures of monasteries have burnt down. The wooden pillars and roofing of Labrang monastery have been reinforced with steel.

Museum 
The monastery houses a museum with a large collection of Buddha statues, sutras and murals.

References

External links 
 Sikkim Tourism Development Corporation

Buddhist monasteries in Sikkim
Nyingma monasteries and temples